David Baird (born 1956 in Canada) is a composer and theatre director who has published books on a wide range of subjects including film, art, Shakespeare, and spirituality.

He was on the production staff of the Welsh National Opera and Drama Company
He was co-founder/director of Cardiff Lab Theatre, and Artistic Director of Doppelganger Theatre and Handspan Theatre Australia.  He is Musical Director with MakeBelieve Arts for touring shows: "The Lorax", "Gulliver's Travels" and "The Woman Who Cooked Everything".

Works
 A Thousand Paths Sourcebooks, Inc. (April 1, 2000), 
 Shakespeare at the Globe, Spruce Books, 1998,

References

Living people
1956 births
Canadian composers
Canadian male composers
Canadian theatre directors
Canadian book publishers (people)
Place of birth missing (living people)